Size is a surname. Notable people with the surname include:

John Size (born 1954), Australian horse trainer working in Hong Kong
Nicholas Size (1866–1953), English writer
Roni Size (born 1969), British record producer and DJ